The Princeton WhistlePigs are a summer collegiate baseball team of the Appalachian League. They are located in Princeton, West Virginia, and play their home games at H. P. Hunnicutt Field. "Whistle pig" is an alternate name for a groundhog.

History
Princeton and H. P. Hunnicutt Field previously served as home to a Minor League Baseball team from 1988 to 2020, last known as the Princeton Rays. In conjunction with a contraction of the minor leagues beginning with the 2021 season, the Appalachian League was reorganized as a collegiate summer baseball league designed for rising college freshmen and sophomores. In the revamped league, the Rays were replaced by the WhistlePigs, who are scheduled to play their first game on June 3, 2021, hosting the Burlington Sock Puppets.

References

Appalachian League teams
Baseball teams established in 2021
2021 establishments in West Virginia
Amateur baseball teams in West Virginia
Princeton, West Virginia